Ankaraspor Kulübü, formerly known as Osmanlıspor, is a Turkish professional football club based in the country's capital Ankara. Founded in 1978, the club competes in the TFF Second League.

History
Ankaraspor was founded as "Ankara Belediye Spor Kulübü" (Ankara Municipality Sport Club) in 1978. The club has undergone several name changes throughout its history. In 1984, they were renamed "Ankara Büyükşehir Belediye Spor Kulübü" (adding "Metropolitan" to the name). The name was simply switched to "Büyükşehir Belediye Ankaraspor Kulübü" in 1998. "Büyükşehir Belediye Ankaraspor Kulübü" has many sub-divisions branching from its main football division. These include badminton, basketball, boxing, handball, ice hockey, judo, oil wrestling, table tennis, wrestling. Finally, in 2005, the football club changed its name to "Ankaraspor A.Ş." and only focused on football, while "Büyükşehir Belediye Ankaraspor Kulübü" continued its activity on branches other than football.

On 15 September 2009, Ankaraspor was demoted from the Turkish Super League by The Professional Football Disciplinary Committee (PFDK) over its unsportsmanlike relationship with Ankaragücü, which was deemed contrary to sporting competitiveness. All Ankaraspor games in the 2009–10 season were cancelled and awarded 3–0 to Ankaraspor's opponents by default. Ankaraspor was expelled from the Turkish leagues by TFF on 4 August 2010 due to being sued by TFF for objecting to forced relegation in 2009–10.

In the 2013–14 season, they were readmitted to TFF First League. In the 2014–15 season, they were champions of the division, resulting in their promotion to the Süper Lig.

On 29 June 2014, the club adopted the name "Osmanlıspor", which refers to Osman I, founder of the Ottoman Empire.

On 8 September 2020, Osmanlıspor was renamed Ankaraspor, their former name.

Club badge and colours

Ankaraspor's home colours are blue and white.

The previous badge consisted of a blue and white colored shield, which bore the name and the foundation year of the club. The shield featured a view of an Anatolian leopard with some hexagon panels of a football in its head and chest. This animal, which lived in Anatolia and especially near Ankara for a period of time, symbolized the power and dignity of the club.

Stadium
Ankaraspor play their home matches at Yenikent Stadium which was opened in 1974 and renovated in 2008.

European participations

Players

Squad

Other players under contract

Out on loan

References

External links
Official website
Ankaraspor on TFF.org

 
Association football clubs established in 1978
Football clubs in Ankara
1978 establishments in Turkey
Süper Lig clubs